Bhilona is a medium-sized village located in Achalpur Taluka of Amravati district, Maharashtra.

Demographics 
Bhilona's language is gavrani marathi. According to a census in 2011, Bhilona's total population is 1598 and number of houses are 374. Female Population is 49.4%. Village literacy rate is 76.3% and the Female Literacy rate is 35.2%.

References

Villages in Amravati district